Robert Hawkins (11 November 1875 – 14 June 1945) was a British sports shooter. He competed in the 300 metre free rifle event at the 1908 Summer Olympics.

References

1875 births
1945 deaths
British male sport shooters
Olympic shooters of Great Britain
Shooters at the 1908 Summer Olympics
People from Mid Devon District
Sportspeople from Devon